The 2019 New Brunswick Scotties Tournament of Hearts, the provincial women's curling championship of New Brunswick, was held from January 23 to 27 at Curl Moncton in Moncton. The winning Andrea Crawford team represented New Brunswick at the 2019 Scotties Tournament of Hearts in Sydney, Nova Scotia, finishing with a 3–4 record. The event was held in conjunction with the 2019 NB Tankard, the provincial men's curling championship.

Qualification

Teams
The teams were listed as follows:

Round-robin standings

Round-robin results
All draw times are listed in Atlantic Standard Time (UTC-04:00)

Draw 2
Wednesday, January 23, 15:45

Draw 4
Thursday, January 24, 09:00

Draw 6
Thursday, January 24, 20:00

Draw 7
Friday, January 25, 09:00

Draw 9
Friday, January 25, 20:00

Playoffs

Semifinal
Saturday, January 26, 20:00

Final
Sunday, January 27, 14:30

References

2019 in New Brunswick
New Brunswick
January 2019 sports events in Canada
Curling competitions in Moncton